Very Special is an album by the jazz pianist Junko Onishi, recorded and released in 2017.

Track listing

Personnel 
 Junko Onishi – Piano, Fender Rhodes (C5, C9)
 Takayoshi Baba – Guitar (C2, C4, C7, C9, C10)
 José James – Vocal (C3, C8)
 Miho Hazama – Arranger and conductor (C6)
 Takuya Mori – Clarinet (C6)
 Yoshie Sato – Bass clarinet (C6)
 Shinnosuke Takahashi – Cymbals (C1)
 Yousuke Inoue – Bass (C11)

Production 
 Producer – Junko Onishi
 Co-Producer – Hitoshi Namekata (Names Inc.), Ryoko Sakamoto (disunion)

 Recording and mixing engineer – Shinya Matsushita (STUDIO Dede)
Recorded at Sound City A-studio September 7–9, 2107 and Sound City Setagaya September 6, except C3 & C8 at Crescent Studio on January 17, 2011.
 Assistant engineer – Taiyo Nakayama (Sound City)
 Mastering engineer – Akihito Yoshikawa (STUDIO Dede)

 Cover photo – Haruyuki Shirai, Tetsuya Kurahara
 Art direction – Takuma Hojo
 Hair and Make-up Artist – Naoki Katagiri (EFFECTOR), Mari Watanabe (fuwa fuwa) for Ginjiro
 Stylist – Yuka Kikuchi

Release history

References

External links
 Very Special / Junko Onishi – disk union
 

2017 albums
Junko Onishi albums